Piruanycha is a genus of longhorn beetles of the subfamily Lamiinae, containing the following species:

 Piruanycha itaiuba Martins & Galileo, 1997
 Piruanycha ocoa Martins & Galileo, 1997
 Piruanycha pitilla Galileo & Martins, 2005

References

Hemilophini